Magdalena Walach (born 13 May 1976) is a Polish film and theater actress. In 1999 she completed studies at the Ludwik Solski Academy for the Dramatic Arts in Kraków. She is a member of the Bagatela Theatre acting company. Walach is married to actor Paweł Okraska, with whom she had their son Piotr (2006).

Career 
Magdalena Walach is a graduate of Ludwik Solski Academy for the Dramatic Arts (1999). 
A role in a musical adaptation of The Secret Garden, directed by Janusz Szydłowski, was the start of her involvement in the Bagatela Theatre. Since that premiere, she has played roles in performances of "Balladyny", "Kosmosu", "Stosunków na szczycie", "Trzech sióstr" and "Rewizora". She has also appeared on the stages of other Kraków and Warsaw theaters, and also performed in several Television Theatre stagings. Walach competed in the seventh season of Taniec z gwiazdami (Dancing with the Stars), winning first place with dancer Cezary Olszewski. She received a perfect score from judges on 8 occasions.

Filmography

Television theatre

Polish dubbing

References

External links

1976 births
Living people
Polish film actresses
People from Racibórz
Polish stage actresses
21st-century Polish actresses